Animal transportation may refer to:

Transportation of animals:
Transportation of animals
Livestock transportation
Animal transporter
Animal Transportation Association
Transportation by animals:
Animal-powered transport
Pack animal

See also
Animal locomotion